The 1981 St. Louis Cardinals season was the 62nd season the franchise was in the league. The team improved on their previous output of 5–11, winning seven games. Despite the improvement the team failed – for the sixth consecutive season – to reach the playoffs.

After a 3–7 start, including a horrendous 10–52 loss to the Eagles on November 8, Head Coach Jim Hanifan benched Jim Hart for Neil Lomax.  The team would win four of its last six games.

Offseason

NFL Draft

Personnel

Staff

Roster

Schedule

Standings

References 

1981
St. Louis Cardinals